Silvia Susana Bravo Núñez (1945–2000) was a Mexican astronomer specializing in solar physics including the study of the Sun corona, solar wind, and the Sun's magnetic field. She was one of the pioneering researchers in the department of space sciences of the National Autonomous University of Mexico (UNAM) Institute of Geophysics.

Education and career
Bravo studied physics as an undergraduate at UNAM. She completed her PhD at UNAM in 1989, with a dissertation whose translated title is The sun's coronal holes as sources of large-scale disturbances in the solar wind, advised by Blanca Emma Mendoza Ortega and based on research performed at the Cavendish Laboratory in England.

She became a professor and researcher in the UNAM Institute of Geophysics in 1997. As well as her research publications, she was an author of several books of science popularization.

She died of cancer in 2000.

Recognition
Bravo was a member of the Mexican Academy of Sciences.

References

1945 births
2000 deaths
Mexican astronomers
Women astronomers
National Autonomous University of Mexico alumni
Academic staff of the National Autonomous University of Mexico
Members of the Mexican Academy of Sciences